UFC 122: Marquardt vs. Okami was a mixed martial arts event held by the Ultimate Fighting Championship on November 13, 2010 at König Pilsener Arena in Oberhausen, Germany. This event aired on the same day, via tape delay, on Spike TV in the U.S.

Background
This was the UFC's second event in Germany and second in continental Europe. The sport has been met with severe criticism by German media, which led to the banning of minors from the first German UFC event (UFC 99).

The sport itself was actually banned from broadcast altogether in Germany in March 2010 due to the "extent of violence [being] shown to be unacceptable." Regardless, UFC combated the opposition, after stating: "Not getting TV isn't going to stop us; we're going to keep going. We can't get into Ontario; we're opening an office there. It doesn't bother us."

Vitor Belfort was set to face Yushin Okami in the main event, with the winner receiving a middleweight title shot. However, on September 21, 2010, Belfort withdrew from the fight to face Anderson Silva. Nate Marquardt ended up fighting Yushin Okami in the main event, which would still determine the next #1 contender.

Vladimir Matyushenko was scheduled to face Jason Brilz at this event, but Brilz was forced off the card on October 6 with a back injury and replaced by Alexandre Ferreira. The Matyushenko/Brilz matchup was rescheduled for UFC 129 in April 2011.

Pascal Krauss was expected to make his promotional debut against fellow newcomer Kenny Robertson, but Robertson was forced from the card with an injury on October 13. Mark Scanlon replaced Robertson.

An illness forced Alessio Sakara out of his co-main event bout with Jorge Rivera while the preliminary fights were taking place. The fight was scrapped from the card.  As a result, the Ludwig vs. Osipczak bout was promoted to first fight on the main card.

The event averaged 2.2 million viewers on Spike TV which drew a higher average rating than UFC 120 which drew 1.9 million viewers.

Results

Bonus awards
Fighters were awarded $60,000 bonuses.

Fight of the Night: Pascal Krauss vs. Mark Scanlon
Knockout of the Night: Karlos Vemola
Submission of the Night: Dennis Siver

References

See also
 Ultimate Fighting Championship
 List of UFC champions
 List of UFC events
 2010 in UFC

Ultimate Fighting Championship events
2010 in mixed martial arts
Mixed martial arts in Germany
Sport in Oberhausen
2010 in German sport